Paratritania is a monotypic beetle genus in the family Cerambycidae described by Stephan von Breuning in 1961. Its only species, Paratritania alternans, was described by Per Olof Christopher Aurivillius in 1920.

References

Onciderini
Beetles described in 1920
Monotypic beetle genera